John Haywood or Heywood may refer to:
John Haywood (politician) (1754–1827), North Carolina state treasurer
John Haywood (American historian) (1762–1826), Tennessee judge and historian
John Haywood (British historian), British historian
John Haywood (cricketer), English cricketer

See also
John Heywood (disambiguation)
John Heywood Hawkins (1802–1877), British Member of Parliament for Mitchell 1830–1831, Newport 1833–1841
John Hayward (disambiguation)